Taldy-Bulak is a village in the Talas Region of Kyrgyzstan. Its population was 3,615 in 2021.

References

Populated places in Talas Region